The 1795 New York gubernatorial election was held in April 1795 to elect the Governor and Lieutenant Governor of New York.

Candidates
The Federalist Party nominated Chief Justice of the United States John Jay who had been their nominee in 1792 and lost in a controversial and narrow election. They nominated state senator Stephen Van Rensselaer for Lieutenant Governor.

The Democratic-Republican Party nominated Chief Justice of the New York Supreme Court Robert Yates. They nominated former U.S. representative William Floyd for Lieutenant Governor.

Results
The Federalist ticket of Jay and Van Rensselaer was elected.

Sources
Result: The Tribune Almanac 1841

See also
New York gubernatorial elections
New York state elections

1795
New York
Gubernatorial
John Jay